Antonin Berruyer, born on 9 September 1998, is a French rugby union player who plays for FC Grenoble in the Top 14. His preferred position is flanker.

Rugby career 

Berruyer started playing rugby as a youth at US Vinay. His natural strength and athleticism saw interest from top 14 side, FC Grenoble.
He made his professional debut for FC Grenoble in 2017 and has become a regular at the rear of the scrum for the French side.

France U20s 
• Winner of the Six Nations Under 20s Championship with the France national under-20 side.
• Winner of the 2018 World Rugby Under 20 Championship in 2018 with the France national under-20 rugby union team.

References

External links 
 Antonin Berruyer's profile on  allrugby.com 

French rugby union players
Rugby union flankers
1998 births
Living people
Rugby union number eights
Sportspeople from Isère
FC Grenoble players
People from Saint-Martin-d'Hères